Bienias is a surname. Notable people with the surname include:

Andrea Bienias (born 1959), German high jumper
Bryan Bienias, bassist for American rock band Cougars
Julia Bienias, American biostatistician

See also
Bientie